The Seongsan Bridge is the 12th bridge that crosses the Han River in South Korea and connects the districts of Mapo District and Yeongdeungpo District. The bridge was completed in 1980.
It is one of 31 bridges over the Han River and has a length of about 1400 meters. It is popular with photographers because it is aesthetic and slightly thicker than the other bridges.

References

Bridges in Seoul
Bridges completed in 1980
National Route 1 (South Korea)